This is a list of banks operating in the United Kingdom.

Central bank
The Bank of England is the central bank of the United Kingdom.

The Big Four 

British banking has been highly consolidated since the early 20th century. Unlike some other major economies, the UK does not have a major stratum of independent local banks. The number of independent banks shrank further during 2008: Northern Rock was nationalised by the UK Government (and is now owned by Virgin Money), followed by Bradford & Bingley; Alliance & Leicester was acquired by Santander, who merged it into Santander UK. On 18 September 2008, Lloyds TSB plc entered into a confirmed agreement to take over HBOS plc, which took effect on 19 January 2009, when HBOS was acquired and folded into Lloyds Banking Group.

The retail and commercial banking markets are dominated by HSBC, Barclays, Lloyds Banking Group, NatWest Group and Spanish-owned Santander UK (most of these companies operate more than one banking brand in the UK).

Banks incorporated in the UK
A full list of businesses considered banks by the Prudential Regulation Authority are listed in the table below. The list is based on the definition of 'bank' in the glossary of the PRA Handbook.

There is also a government-run savings bank called National Savings and Investments.

British retail banks
These banks provide retail services to the general public. Retail banks are usually known as High street banks because they have multiple branch locations located in the commercial part of cities and towns across the UK. Four British retail banks have no physical branch presence, however. 

The retail and commercial banking markets are dominated by five big banks. HSBC, Barclays, Lloyds Banking Group, NatWest Group and Spanish-owned Santander UK who operate more than one banking brand in the UK.

Retail banks owned by retailers 
There are a number of other retail banking businesses owned by retailers including:
Post Office Money, the trading name used by Post Office Ltd  for its branded financial products, most of which are provided by Bank of Ireland UK
Sainsbury's Bank, owned by British supermarket company Sainsbury's.
Tesco Bank, owned by British supermarket company Tesco.
Harrods Bank was acquired by Tandem Money Limited on 11 January 2018

UK banking brands owned by foreign banks
Allied Irish Bank (GB) and First Trust Bank, owned by AIB Group of the Republic of Ireland
 Al Rayan Bank, owned by Masraf Al Rayan of Qatar
 Axis Bank UK, owned by Axis Bank of India
Bank of Ceylon (UK), owned by Bank of Ceylon of Sri Lanka
Bank of Baroda (UK), owned by Bank of Baroda of India
Bank of China (UK), owned by Bank of China
Bank of India (UK), owned by Bank of India
Bank Sepah International plc, owned by Bank Sepah of Iran
FCMB Bank (UK) Limited, owned by First City Monument Bank of Nigeria
Zenith Bank (UK), owned by Zenith Bank of Nigeria
Bank of Ireland UK, owned by Bank of Ireland of the Republic of Ireland; one of the leading banks in Northern Ireland, and present in Great Britain to a lesser extent
Citibank (UK), owned by Citigroup of the United States
ICBC (London) plc, by Industrial and Commercial Bank of China
ICICI Bank (UK), owned by ICICI Bank of India
Danske Bank (formerly Northern Bank), owned by Danske Bank of Denmark
Habib Bank UK, owned by Habib Bank of Pakistan
Punjab National Bank (International), owned by Punjab National Bank of India
RCI Bank UK, owned by RCI Banque SA
Santander UK (formerly Abbey, Alliance & Leicester and Bradford & Bingley), owned by Santander Group of Spain
SEB (UK), owned by Skandinaviska Enskilda Banken, Sweden
State Bank of India (UK), owned by State Bank of India
Svenska Handelsbanken, UK Branch
The Bank of East Asia, UK Branch
TSB Bank, part of Sabadell Group, headquartered in Spain
Union Bank of India (UK) Ltd, owned by Union Bank of India of India
United Bank UK, owned by United Bank Limited of Pakistan

Building societies in the UK 
The other main class of consumer financial service organisation in the United Kingdom is the building society. The building society sector has become much smaller with fewer building societies. This was caused, firstly,  a number of building societies demutualising in the 1980s and 1990s and subsequently, taken over by banks. Secondly, there has been ongoing consolidation via mergers between societies. 

There are 42 building societies in the UK as of 2021 which provide retail banking services to the general public. The five largest as of October 2020 are:

See also

 2008 United Kingdom bank rescue package
 2009 United Kingdom bank rescue package
 Banking in the United Kingdom
 Building society
 List of building societies in the United Kingdom
 :Category:Banks of British Overseas Territories
 :Category:Defunct banks of the United Kingdom

Notes

References

External links
List of active banks in the United Kingdom with swift codes
List of the Electronic Money Institutions (EMI) licensed in the United Kingdom
Electronic Money Institutions (EMI) for business in the United Kingdom
BBA - British Bankers' Association - BBA member banks
Bank of England Prudential Regulation Authority - banks & building societies list (updated monthly)

 
United Kingdom
Banks
United Kingdom